The 1951 Clemson Tigers football team was an American football team that represented Clemson College in the Southern Conference during the 1951 college football season. In its 12th season under head coach Frank Howard, the team compiled a 7–3 record (3–1 against conference opponents), finished fifth in the Southern Conference, was tied with Holy Cross at No. 19 in the final AP Poll, lost to Miami (FL) in the 1952 Gator Bowl, and outscored all opponents by a total of 196 to 97. The team played its home games at Memorial Stadium in Clemson, South Carolina.

Bob Patton was the team captain. The team's statistical leaders included tailback Billy Hair with 1,004 passing yards and 698 rushing yards and end Glenn Smith with 42 points (7 touchdowns).

Billy Hair and Glenn Smith were selected as first-team players on the 1951 All-Southern Conference football team. Four Clemson players were named to the All-South Carolina football team for 1951: Hair, Smith, tackle Bob Patton, and guard Dan DiMucci.

Schedule

References

Clemson
Clemson Tigers football seasons
Clemson Tigers football